Kalinin is a rural locality (a khutor) in Shakinskoye Rural Settlement, Kumylzhensky District, Volgograd Oblast, Russia. The population was 4 as of 2010.

Geography 
Kalinin is located in forest steppe, on Khopyorsko-Buzulukskaya Plain, on the bank of the Srednyaya Yelan River, 47 km west of Kumylzhenskaya (the district's administrative centre) by road. Krasnopolov is the nearest rural locality.

References 

Rural localities in Kumylzhensky District